The Shijiahe culture (2500–2000 BC) was a late Neolithic culture centered on the middle Yangtze River region in Shijiahe Town, Tianmen, Hubei Province, China. It succeeded the Qujialing culture in the same region and inherited its unique artefact of painted spindle whorls. Pottery figurines and distinct jade worked with advanced techniques were also common to the culture.

Overview
The culture is named after its type site, the Shijiahe site cluster, in Tianmen, Hubei, in the Middle Yangtze Valley. The lower layer of the site belonged to the Qujialing culture. It may have housed from between 15,000 and 50,000 inhabitants within the settlement's walls. At Dengjiawan, within the Shijiahe site cluster, some pieces of copper were discovered, making these the earliest copper objects discovered so far in southern China.

The primary mode of travel was thought to be watercraft. People even built channels as makeshift rivers to connect urban core areas to adjacent rivers or from towns to main rivers. In addition to walls, moats were also dug around towns and urban centers in the same fashion as the constructed channels. At the town site at Chengtoushan, the moat is about 40–50 m in width. Researchers estimate that a total labor force of 200,000 to 470,000 people was needed to construct the moat and walls at this site. The people of the Shijiahe culture grew both rice and millet.

Some scholars have speculated that Shijiahe could have been considered an ancient state due to its relatively advanced socio-political structure. Shijiahe is said to have a population size and land area greater than Erlitou, however it is not very clear if they had the same level of centralized control over these regions that the Erlitou did. Other scholars note that the Shijiahe and other cultures along the Yangtze were more socially complex and developed than their northern contemporaries in the Han Valley.

Jade artifacts
Many jade artifacts have been unearthed from Shijiahe sites, mainly dating from the late phase. Most jades have parallels in the Liangzhu culture, and in many ways the Shijiahe site complex is similar to the Mojiaoshan complex of Liangzhu, suggesting strong influences from the lower Yangtze region to the east.

In 2015, archaeologists excavated the Tanjialing site, dating to late Shijiahe culture. They discovered more than 250 pieces of jade in five tombs. The jade carving technology exhibited by these artifacts appear to have exceeded that of the Liangzhu and Hongshan cultures, both of which are renowned for their jades.

Decline
The Shijiahe culture ended around 2000 BC, about the same time as Liangzhu. However, unlike the Liangzhu culture, which completely disappeared, Shijiahe seems to have had a drastic decrease in population. Some scholars believe the decline was a result of warfare with the Longshan culture, which was expanding from the north. Other possible reasons are flooding, collapse of social order or a combination of these factors.  From 4200 cal BP, severe drought eroded the economic foundation of rice-cultivation.

See also
Three Sovereigns and Five Emperors
Xia dynasty

Footnotes

Works cited

Further reading 
 Allan, Sarah (ed), The Formation of Chinese Civilization: An Archaeological Perspective, 
 

Neolithic cultures of China
Chinese architectural history
Archaeological sites in China
History of Hubei
History of Hunan
3rd-millennium BC establishments in China